Shi Yiting (born October 17, 1997) is a Chinese para athlete. She has impaired muscle movement in her left arm and different lengths in both of her legs. She won three gold medals at the Summer Paralympics and four gold medals at the World Para Athletics Championships.

References

External links 
  (archive)

1997 births
Living people
Sportspeople from Changsha
Paralympic athletes of China
Athletes (track and field) at the 2016 Summer Paralympics
Athletes (track and field) at the 2020 Summer Paralympics
Medalists at the 2016 Summer Paralympics
Medalists at the 2020 Summer Paralympics
Paralympic gold medalists for China
World Para Athletics Championships winners
Paralympic medalists in athletics (track and field)
Chinese female sprinters